Glin or GLIN may refer to:

 Global Legal Information Network, federation of government agencies that contribute national legal information 
 Glin, County Limerick, village in Ireland
 Glin GAA Club, a team in West Limerick
 Knight of Glin, hereditary title held by the Fitzgeralds of Limerick 
 Glin Castle, manor home in the village of Glin that was the seat of the Knight of Glin
 Great Lakes Information Network, an initiative of the Great Lakes Commission in the United States
 Glin the good fairy, character in Oz (1976 film)
 Glin, member of the Sweeper Alliance in the manga Black Cat
 Glin, a province in the science fiction novel A Time of Changes

See also
Desmond FitzGerald, 29th Knight of Glin (1937-2011), an Irish nobleman and president of the Irish Georgian Society
 Glen
 Glinn (disambiguation)
 Glyn (disambiguation)
 Glynn (disambiguation)
 Glynne (disambiguation)